Barry Scott Wimpfheimer is an American scholar of the Talmud and Rabbinic literature. He is an associate professor at Northwestern University and chair of its department of religious studies.

Biography 
Wimpfheimer grew up in an Orthodox household in Washington Heights, New York and began studying the Talmud since 17. He earned his B.A. from Columbia University and M.A. from Yeshiva University in Talmudic studies. He received his rabbinic ordination in 2000. He then earned a Ph.D. from Columbia in religion, studying under David Weiss Halivni. His work has focused on the Babylonian Talmud as a work of law and literature.

Wimpfheimer's book on the history and evolution of the Talmud, The Talmud: A Biography (2018) won a National Jewish Book Award in 2018. He argued that the Talmud can be read in three different ways: the essential Talmud, which sees the Talmud as a work of religious literature produced at a certain historical period; the enhanced Talmud, which sees the text as the central canonical work of Judaism after the Destruction of the temple; and the emblematic Talmud, which sees the scripture as the primary symbol of Jews, Judaism and Jewishness.

Wimpfheimer also teaches an online introductory Talmud course via Coursera. He is the co-editor of Prooftexts: A Journal of Jewish Literary History.

References 

Living people
Northwestern University faculty
Columbia College (New York) alumni
Columbia Graduate School of Arts and Sciences alumni
Yeshiva University alumni
American rabbis
Year of birth missing (living people)